The Montevideo Cannabis Museum opened in December 2016, inspired by the legalization of cannabis in Uruguay in 2013. Some of the collection came from the Hash, Marihuana & Hemp Museum in Amsterdam. And some of it came from Hempstead Project Heart in San Rafael, California, an organization dedicated to the legalization of hemp in the United States.

See also 
 List of museums in Montevideo

External links

References 

2016 in cannabis
Cannabis in Uruguay
Cannabis museums
Museums established in 2016
2016 establishments in Uruguay
Museums in Montevideo
Science museums in Uruguay